Ibrahim Salah may refer to:

 Ibrahim Salah (footballer, born 1987), Egyptian football defensive midfielder
 Ibrahim Salah (footballer, born 2001), Belgian football winger for Rennes